Charles Albert "Tod" Eberle (July 4, 1886 – May 10, 1967) was an American player and coach of college football and college basketball.

Biography
Eberle graduated from Swarthmore College in 1911, where he lettered in football, basketball, baseball, and track; he was also a member of the Kappa Sigma fraternity.

Eberle served as the head football coach at New Hampshire College of Agriculture and the Mechanic Arts for 1912 and 1913, compiling a record of 5–8–1. Eberle was also the head basketball coach at New Hampshire for the 1912–13 season, tallying a mark of 5–5.

Eberle married Anna Oppenlander in November 1914. He died in May 1967, at the age of 80.

Head coaching record
Football

Notes

References

1886 births
1967 deaths
American men's basketball players
Basketball coaches from Washington, D.C.
New Hampshire Wildcats football coaches
New Hampshire Wildcats men's basketball coaches
Swarthmore Garnet Tide baseball players
Swarthmore Garnet Tide football coaches
Swarthmore Garnet Tide football players
Swarthmore Garnet Tide men's basketball players
College men's basketball head coaches in the United States
College men's track and field athletes in the United States
Coaches of American football from Washington, D.C.
Players of American football from Washington, D.C.